Spilosoma virginica is a species of moth in the subfamily Arctiinae.  As a caterpillar, it is known as the yellow woolly bear or yellow bear caterpillar.  As an adult, it is known as the Virginian tiger moth.

Caterpillar life stage

Identification
The caterpillar varies in color, but is typically consistent in its coloration in a single specimen, without odd tufts of different-colored hair or separately colored heads.

Diet
It has a diet of a wide range of low-growing plants, including ground cover like grass and clover. The larvae are defoliators, skeletonizing the leaves they feed on, but only the late summer batch of caterpillars is plentiful enough to do much damage to crops. This species tends to have two to three life cycles per year, with one hibernating for the winter in temperate climates.

Adult moth life stage
The adult moth tends to tent its wings over its back, rather than sitting with them spread. It is white with a darker-colored abdomen, but without the obvious, darker eyes of its close cousin the agreeable tiger moth.  It is not poisonous, but some people may have an allergic reaction to the bristles on its body.

Reproduction
The female is slightly larger than the male in larva form, and as an adult finds a mate by extruding an organ that emits a pheromone which the male can smell. The male, which unlike the female has the large, feathered antennae characteristic of pheromone-using moths, flies zigzag search patterns, eventually homing in on a female. After mating, he goes off to find other females, while the female stops to lay between 20 and 100 eggs in a single layer on the underside of a leaf. The larvae stay together when very young, but become solitary as they gain size.

See also

Woolly bear caterpillar

References

Spilosoma virginica at BOLD
Spilosoma virginica at EOL
Spilosoma virginica at BHL

Further reading

virginica
Moths of North America
Moths described in 1798